Mazda has a long history of building its own diesel engines, with the exception of a few units that were built under license.

Inline-fours
 PN -  - Used in the Mazda Familia and Ford Laser
 R2 -  - Used in the 1984 onwards Mazda Bongo
 SL -  - Used in the T3500 light truck (Mazda Titan)
 TF -  -
 TM -  -
 VS -  -
 WL - , bore x stroke  - naturally aspirated or turbodiesel, used in non-US 1995 Mazda MPV, various Mazda B-Series trucks.
 W9 - , bore x stroke  - naturally aspirated diesel, an enlarged version of the WL
 XB -  - , used in 1973 Mazda Parkway (AEXC), E2700 Van and T2700 Titan.
 XC -  -

Perkins 200 series
The Perkins 200 series engines (GA/GB/GC in internal parlance) were manufactured by licensee Toyo Kogo (Mazda) for use in automotive and other applications. Perkins 4.135, 4.154, and 4.182 manufactured replacement engine parts are used interchangeably in the Mazda S2, XA, and HA engines, respectively.
 S2 -  - License built Perkins 4.135 related to HA and XA, used in 1979 to 1986 Mazda Luce, Bongo/E2200, B2200, Ford Ranger
 XA -  - License built Perkins 4.154 related to HA and S2, used in 1970 Mazda E2500 and 1971 Mazda Titan, Mazda Parkway and some Bobcat skid-steer loaders. A six-cylinder version of this is called the "YA".
 HA -  - License built Perkins 4.182 related to S2 and XA

All of these engines have cast iron blocks and heads, two overhead valves per cylinder driven by maintenance-free timing gears, crossflow heads, are indirect injection. US-market B2200 and Ford Ranger trucks - and possibly the others as well - had rotary Bosch VE-style injection pumps, built by Diesel Kiki under license from Bosch.

RF
A diesel variation of the  FE engine which shares its square internal dimensions of  bore and stroke - it is virtually the same block, with identical bell housing pattern and block dimensions. This could be a testament to the F-block's strength as it was over-built for naturally aspirated duty. Its alloy head is entirely different though, with valves directly actuated rather than the rockers of the FE. The glow plugs are located in remote combustion chambers, with fuel delivered by a mechanical pump. The RF The RF and R2 continue production to this day as the MZR-CD, with counter-rotating balance-shafts mounted between the engine block and oil pan as well as much evolved head and direct-injection technology. The RF is a SOHC, two valves-per-cylinder engine. One of Mazda's more popular diesel engines, it was also available with a pressure wave supercharger called Comprex.

Applications:
 1987–1992 Mazda Capella/626
  at 4000 rpm,  at 2750 rpm (DIN, naturally aspirated EU version)
 1983–1990 Mazda E-series
 1999-2005 Mazda Premacy
 1999 Mazda 626
 1984–1986 Ford Tempo/Mercury Topaz
 1984–1987 Ford Escort/Mercury Lynx (North America)
 1988–1991 Kia Concord
 1998–2003 Kia Sportage, Turbo-intercooler diesel variant released for Asia
 1994–1998 Suzuki Vitara
 1998–2003 Suzuki Grand Vitara

RF 1998
Latest emission improved version used in Mazda 323 adopts a new swirl chamber with an enlarged volume, revised swirl-chamber-to-main-chamber ratio and a narrower throat area.

Further engine features:
 optimized intake manifold, with inertia moment effect flow
 electrically controlled distributor-type fuel injection pump
 electronically controlled EGR valve

Engines were mounted in:
 Mazda 323 P 3D hatchback and 4D sedan since June 1997
 Mazda 323 5D hatchback since August 1998

RF-CX Comprex
 ABB Comprex pressure wave supercharger
  at 4,000 rpm,  at 2000 rpm (JDM 1987)
  at 4,000 rpm,  at 2000 rpm (JIS Netto, JDM Comprex 1991)
 Used in JDM Capellas (1987–1991), introduced in June 1992 European Mazda 626

RF-T DI 1998 (2.0 DiTD)
A direct-injection turbo version  with four valves per cylinder, called the DiTD was introduced in the June 1998 Mazda 626 Wagon 2.0 DiTD. Engine has SOHC valve train with rocker arms and mechanically adjusted screws (no hydraulic valve lifters), with Denso V5 rotary injection pump and Denso PCM.

There were three power versions:
  at 4000 rpm with maximum torque  at 1800 rpm
  at 4000 rpm with maximum torque  at 1800–2200 rpm
  at 4000 rpm with maximum torque  at 2000–2600 rpm

Engines were mounted in:
 Mazda 323 5D hatchback and 4D sedan since August 1998 ( version)
 Mazda 323 5D hatchback and 4D sedan since May 2001 ( version)
 Mazda 626 Capella since June 1998 ( version)
 Mazda 626 Capella since October 2000 ( version)
 Mazda Premacy as DE 2.0L (DIREC-D) Euro III

RF 2002 (2.0 MZR-CD)
Both versions have same compression ratio 18.3:1. Torque output (both versions have same maximum  at 2000 rpm), fuel efficiency and NOx emissions were improved by using:
 expansive vertical vortex combustion (EVVC), which combines a special piston surface design, with ingenious fuel distribution, to produce a vertical swirl in the combustion chamber
 variable turbine geometry (VNT) turbocharger
Combined fuel economy is achieving  and emission rating Euro Stage III (D4) with on a regular basis mounted catalytic converter with Lambda probe and exhaust-gas recirculation system (EGR).
Engines were mounted in (in order of appearance):
 1st generation Mazda 6 Atenza (both versions) since June 2002
 2nd generation Mazda MPV (only High Power version) since June 2002

RF 2005 (2.0 MZR-CD)
Production of improved, cleaner and more powerful common rail direct-injection turbocharged version of Mazda RF engine was started with July 2005 Mazda 6 facelift. This drivetrain still has most of typical features of its predecessor including belt-driven SOHC valve train with rocker arms and mechanically adjusted screws (in contrast to frequently mismatched, absolutely different ZSD or PSA DW10 Ford Duratorq engines). Mazda applied several technologies to this MZR-CD engine to achieve Euro Stage IV:
 new variable geometry turbocharger has 14 percent less inertial moment and is more compact in design (achieved, for instance, by a shorter distance between the exhaust gas inlet and the turbine shaft)
 Denso's 1800 bar second generation common rail system that, depending on driving conditions, uses multi-stage injection of up to nine times per cycle with six-hole injectors
 relatively low compression ratio of 16.7:1 improves power output and torque(???), while at the same time helping to lower combustion noise and emissions
  emissions were reduced by lowering the engine's combustion temperature
 O2 sensor constantly measures residual oxygen in the exhaust gases and this information is sent to 32-bit powertrain control module (PCM), which continuously optimizes the air/fuel mix
Both versions come with a DPF system standard, which traps soot in a coated ceramic filter. As soon as the filter's storage capacity is exhausted, exhaust gas temperature is raised for a short period (using only diesel pre and post-injection techniques, not any fuel burner additive) and the particles burn off. As a result, the RF 2005 engines emit 80 percent less particulate matter than required by Euro Stage IV standards.
Engines were mounted in (in order of appearance):
 1st generation Mazda 6/Atenza (both versions) since July 2005
 Mazda 5/Premacy (both versions) since January 2006
 1st generation Mazda 3/Axela (only High Power version) since March 2007

RF 2007 (2.0 MZR-CD)
Newly calibrated powertrain control module mapping resulted in better drivability, fuel efficiency and emission performance. This engine has changed layout of the intake/exhaust, with more efficient EGR cooler, better DPF and combined fuel consumption , less than its predecessor.
Engine was mounted in (in order of appearance):
 2nd generation Mazda 6 Atenza since November 2007

R2
A diesel variation of the  F2 which shares its  bore and stroke.
Displacement:

Power net:(Black Top)
 (JIS net) at 4050 rpm
Torque:
 - at 2500 rpm
Power net:(Silver Top)
 (JIS net) at 4050 rpm
Torque:
 - at 2500 rpm

Applications:
 1987–1991 Mazda B-series
 1990-1997 Asia Rocsta

R2 2008 (2.2 MZR-CD)

2.2 MZR-CD engine features:
 Denso HP3-based common rail with system injection pressure increased to 
 common rail injectors that have 10 spray small  holes (instead of the 6 used on the MZR-CD 2.0) and higher response solenoids
 low compression ratio of 16.3:1, made possible with highly atomizing injectors
 VNT turbocharger with curved vanes and abradable seal
 chain-driven DOHC valve system
 aluminium lower block combined with low-friction, front chain-drive balancer shaft
 newly developed, high thermal resistance DPF system with global-first ceramic support matrix structure
 newly developed EGR cooler
 Euro Stage V emission rating
 new Selective catalytic reduction (SCR) system with AdBlue additive significantly reduces  emissions (currently only in Mazda CX-7, in special  tank located under the luggage compartment, lasts over  under normal driving conditions)
 electro-hydraulic power-assisted steering

Engine is mounted in (in order of appearance):
 2nd generation Mazda 6 Atenza since November 2008 (High, Mid and Low power versions), MZR-CD 2.0-litre turbo diesel remains in the line-up in some markets
 2nd generation Mazda 3 Axela (High and Standard power versions)
 1st generation 2009 facelift Mazda CX-7
Engine is planned for (in order of appearance):
 1st generation Mazda 5 Premacy (High, Mid and Low power versions)

Mazda 2.2 MZR-CD R2 engine has no relation to the family of belt-driven PSA DW12B twin turbo engine.

SH 2.2 SKYACTIV-D 
Introduced at the 41st Tokyo Motor Show (2009)
 high fuel pressure common-rail system that controls piezo injectors
 aluminium block
 significantly reduced size and weight of reciprocating and rotating parts (aluminum block, lightweight pistons and connecting rods)
 similar weight to the petrol version
 wide-range, high volume EGR
 two stage (Dual Stage two turbo) twin-turbocharger with high turbopressure over a broader engine rev range
 PM oxidation catalyst-supported diesel particulate filter (DPF) with shorter regeneration
 20 percent better fuel efficiency than Mazda's R2 2.2 MZR-CD 
 These engines are subjected to a number of recalls world-wide relating to leaking fuel injectors seals resulting in carbon build-up causing vacuum pump and turbo charger failure.

WL-T 2.5 

 2.5 Diesel Turbo 2499cc 
 81 kW / 109p Power @ 3500rpm
 265NM / 196Ft·lb Torque @ 2000rpm
 Found in Mazda Bounty (UN Chassis Code), Mazda Bongo Friendee, Ford Courier Ford Freda and Ford Ranger 1998 - 2006

Y4

Mazda Y4 engine (called 1.4 MZ-CD or 1.4 CiTD) is a rebadged PSA DV4 engine, produced in the PSA engine plant in Trémery or Ford's engine plant in Dagenham.

Engine features:
 SOH—÷ emission rating (Euro Stage IV with DPF system, catalytic additive in separate 1.8 L tank, refreshed every

Y6
The Mazda Y6 engine (called 1.6 MZ-CD or 1.6 CiTD) is a rebadged PSA DV6 engine, produced in the PSA engine plant in Trémery and the Ford engine plant in Dagenham. The engines are shipped to Hiroshima and mounted into the Mazda 3 (Axela) and Mazda 2 DE in three versions coupled to 5 or 6-speed manuals (Getrag-Ford developed, J65M-R) or 4-speed automatic "Activematic" transmission:
  at 4000 rpm,  at 1750 rpm
  at 4000 rpm,  at 2000 rpm mounted in Mazda 2 DE
  at 4000 rpm,  at 1750 rpm

Engine features:
 DOHC belt-driven
 aluminium cylinder block with cast iron liners
 dual-mass flywheel
 second generation Bosch common rail injection system with pilot injection phase and  pressure
 6-hole injectors
 Bosch EDC16 powertrain control module
 drive by wire accelerator pedal
 Garrett GT15 (VNT15) turbocharger
 large front mount intercooler (larger than 2.0 MZR-CD)
 Euro Stage III emission rating (Euro Stage IV with DPF system, catalytic additive in separate 1.8 L tank, refreshed every

Inline six
 YA - ,  - Mazda Boxer (EYA)
 ZB -  - Mazda Boxer (EZA), Mazda Titan (2nd generation), Asia/Kia Combi
 ZC -  -

See also
 Mazda F engine
 Mazda MZR engine
 Mazda engines

References

History of the diesel engine
Diesel